"Pride" is a single by the Japanese rock band Nothing's Carved in Stone released on July 18, 2012. It was used as the opening theme for the anime Kingdom.

Track listing

References 

2012 singles
2012 songs
Anime songs